Mason Gross School of the Arts is the arts conservatory at Rutgers University in New Brunswick, New Jersey. It is named for Mason W. Gross, the sixteenth president of Rutgers. Mason Gross offers the Bachelor of Fine Arts in Dance, Theater, Digital Filmmaking, and Visual Arts, Bachelor of Music, Master of Fine Arts in Theater and Visual Arts, Master of Education in Dance, Master of Music, Doctor of Musical Arts, Artist Diploma in Music, and MA and Ph.D. in composition, theory, and musicology. Mason Gross recently introduced a new program in the Visual Arts that offers a Bachelor of Design. 

Mason Gross was founded in 1976 as a school of the fine and performing arts within Rutgers University and in 1976 became a separate degree-granting institution from the other Undergraduate colleges.

All fine arts departments at the other Rutgers colleges were merged into Mason Gross in 1981 and as of 2005 has expanded to more than 20 buildings, including the spacious visual arts studios at the Livingston campus and the Civic Square Building in the center of New Brunswick and a variety of performing-arts spaces. The buildings are all situated within Rutgers' Douglass College campus with the exception of the Civic Square Building (on Livingston Avenue) in the city's Civic Square government and theatre district and the sculpture facilities (on the Livingston campus).

Theater actor, director, and playwright Jack Bettenbender served as first dean of the school, from 1976 until his death in 1988. Bettenbender directed hundreds of theatrical productions, both at Rutgers and in New York City. An outdoor space dedicated in 2002 to honor John Bettenbender, the founding dean of the Mason Gross School of the Arts. The square is a gathering spot for students between classes, the site of impromptu performances and a summer setting for evening events. Avery Brooks gave the dedication eulogy.

Bettenbender Plaza
Bettenbender Plaza sits in front of Nicholas Music Hall, the performing arts center of Rutgers University, New Brunswick. The challenge was to design a plaza that would complement the theater’s activities as well as act as a gateway to the university.

The Blanche and Irving Laurie Music Library houses approximately 15,000 recordings and 30,000 monographs and scores, serving as a research and reference library at all levels. Studios and stages for the school will be located in the New Brunswick Performing Arts Center upon completion in 2019.

The Mason Gross School of the Arts has more than 500 events taking place annually on campus, alongside classes, rehearsals and numerous recreational activities.

Has an 18% application acceptance rate.

Notable alumni and faculty 
Brandon Flynn (actor, 13 Reasons Why)
Atif Akin (artist, designer)
Emma Amos (painter)
Andrea Anders  (actress, Mr. Sunshine, Joey)
Alice Aycock (sculptor)
Roger Bart (Tony-winning actor, You're a Good Man, Charlie Brown, The Producers Desperate Housewives)
Natalie Bookchin (media artist)
Bill Bowers (mime artist and actor)
Avery Brooks (actor, jazz and opera singer, Star Trek: Deep Space Nine)
Kevin Chamberlin (Tony-nominated actor, The Addams Family, Disney Channel's Jessie)
Cook Thugless members
Melvin Edwards (celebrated abstract steel metal sculptor)
Michael Esper (actor, Broadway's American Idiot)
Paul Cohen (classical-contemporary saxophonist/saxophone historian)
Mike Colter (actor, "Million Dollar Baby The Good Wife, Luke Cage)
Jessica Darrow (actress/singer, voices Luisa Madrigal in Disney's Encanto)
Kristin Davis (Emmy-nominated actress, Sex and the City)
Mike Dawson (cartoonist)
Tim DeKay (actor, "White Collar," "Carnivale," "Tell Me You Love Me")
Angela Ellsworth (artist)
Calista Flockhart (Golden Globe-winning actress, "Ally McBeal," "The Birdcage")
Midori Francis (actress)
Derrick Gardner (jazz trumpeter)
Tina Gharavi (filmmaker, professor)
Nancy Gustafson (soprano, faculty)
Israel Hicks (stage director who presented August Wilson's entire 10-play Pittsburgh Cycle; 1943–2010)
Mary Howard (set and production designer)
Sean Jones (former lead trumpet in the Lincoln Center Jazz Orchestra)
Jane Krakowski (actress)
Allan Kaprow (American painter, assemblagist and a pioneer in establishing the concepts of performance art; August 23, 1927 – April 5, 2006)
Roy Lichtenstein (pop artist)
Linda Lindroth (artist)
Ardele Lister (media artist)
Raphael Montañez Ortíz (performance artist)
Matt Mulhern (actor, writer, director, historian, "Biloxi Blues, Major Dad, Duane Hopwood")
Tarik O'Regan (composer)
Okieriete Onaodowan (Actor, "Hamilton", "Station 19" - did not graduate)
Nell Irvin Painter (artist, historian, author, The History of White People)
Marissa Paternoster (lead singer, Screaming Females)
Cristina Pato (musician with Yo-Yo Ma's Silk Road Ensemble)
Tom Pelphrey (Emmy-winning actor, "Guiding Light," "As The World Turns"; Broadway's "End of the Rainbow")
Tara Platt (voice actress)
William Pope.L (performance artist)
Melissa Potter (artist)
Molly Price (actress, "Third Watch," Broadway's "Death of a Salesman")
Sheryl Lee Ralph (actress, singer, "Dreamgirls," "Moesha")
Charles Ray (artist)
Harry Romero (DJ and record producer known as "Harry Choo Choo Romero")
Martha Rosler (artist)
Bess Rous (actress)
Gary Schneider (artist)
George Segal (painter and sculptor)
Katrín Sigurdardóttir (sculptor, installation artist)
Dave Sirulnick (MTV executive)
Joan Snyder (artist)
Keith Sonnier (minimalist, performance, video and light artist)
Terell Stafford (jazz trumpeter)
Sebastian Stan (actor, Bucky Barnes / Winter Soldier, Marvel Cinematic Universe)
Justin Mortelliti (actor)
Aaron Stanford (actor)
Arnold Steinhardt (first violinist, Guarneri Quartet)
Terrell Tilford (actor)
James Tupper (actor, "Men In Trees," "Grey's Anatomy")
Dietlinde Turban (actor, faculty)
Stephen Westfall (painter)
John Yau (poet)  
Nicholas Alexander Chavez (actor, did not graduate)

See also
List of university and college schools of music

References

Related links
 
 Design Area
 MGSA Sculpture
 Art Portal
 Rutgers University

Art schools in New Jersey
Drama schools in the United States
Music schools in New Jersey
Rutgers University colleges and schools
Educational institutions established in 1975
1975 establishments in New Jersey
Performing arts in New Jersey
Education in Middlesex County, New Jersey